Donald Chipman Harper (November 27, 1904 – May 4, 1965) was a Canadian politician. He served in the Legislative Assembly of New Brunswick from 1952 to 1965 as member of the Liberal party.

References

1904 births
1965 deaths